Kuzyk is a Slavic surname. Notable people with the name include:

 Denys Kuzyk (born 2002), Ukrainian footballer 
 Ken Kuzyk (born 1953), Canadian ice-hockey player
 Mark G. Kuzyk (born 1958), American physicist 
 Mimi Kuzyk (born 1952), Canadian actress
 Orest Kuzyk (born 1995), Ukrainian footballer 
 Roman Kuzyk (born 1989), Ukrainian footballer
 Gary Kuzyk (born 1955), Canadian Refrigeration Branch Manager/Project Sales
 Jon Kuzyk (born 1987),
Canadian Refrigeration Mechanic